Site-specific art is artwork created to exist in a certain place. Typically, the artist takes the location into account while planning and creating the artwork. Site-specific art is produced both by commercial artists, and independently, and can include some instances of work such as sculpture, stencil graffiti, rock balancing, and other art forms. Installations can be in urban areas, remote natural settings, or underwater.

History
The term "site-specific art" was promoted and refined by Californian artist Robert Irwin but it was actually first used in the mid-1970s by young sculptors, such as Patricia Johanson, Dennis Oppenheim, and Athena Tacha, who had started executing public commissions for large urban sites. For Two Jumps for Dead Dog Creek (1970), Oppenheim attempted a series of standing jumps at a selected site in Idaho, where "the width of the creek became a specific goal to which I geared a bodily activity," with his two successful jumps being "dictated by a land form." Site specific environmental art was first described as a movement by architectural critic Catherine Howett and art critic Lucy Lippard. Emerging out of minimalism, site-specific art opposed the Modernist program of subtracting from the artwork all cues that interfere with the fact that it is "art",

Modernist art objects were transportable,  nomadic, could only exist in the museum space and were the objects of the market and commodification. Since 1960 the artists were trying to find a way out of this situation, and thus drew attention to the site and the context around this site. The work of art was created in the site and could only exist and in such circumstances - it can not be moved or changed. Site is a current location, which comprises a unique combination of physical elements: depth, length, weight, height, shape, walls, temperature. Works of art began to emerge from the walls of the museum and galleries (Daniel Buren, Within and Beyond the Frame, John Weber Gallery, New York, 1973), were created specifically for the museum and galleries (Michael Asher, untitled installation at Claire Copley Gallery, Los Angeles, 1974, Hans Haacke, Condensation Cube, 1963–65, Mierle Laderman Ukeles, Hartford Wash: Washing Tracks, Maintenance Outside, Wadsworth Atheneum, Hartford, 1973), thus criticizing the museum as an institution that sets the rules for artists and viewers.

Jean-Max Albert, created Sculptures Bachelard in Parc de la Villette related to the site, or Carlotta’s Smile, a trellis construction related to Ar. Co,’s architecture Lisbon, and to a choreography in collaboration with Michala Marcus and Carlos Zingaro, 1979.

When the public debate over Tilted Arc (1981) resulted in its removal in 1989, its author Richard Serra reacted with what can be considered a definition of site-specific art: "To move the work is to destroy the work."

Examples
Outdoor site-specific artworks often include landscaping combined with permanently sited sculptural elements; it is sometimes linked with environmental art. Outdoor site-specific artworks can also include dance performances created especially for the site. More broadly, the term is sometimes used for any work that is more or less permanently attached to a particular location. In this sense, a building with interesting architecture could also be considered a piece of site-specific art.

In Geneva, Switzerland, the Contemporary Art Funds are looking for original ways to integrate art into architecture and the public space since 1980. The Neon Parallax project, initiated in 2004, is conceived specifically for the Plaine de Plainpalais, a public square of 95'000 square meters, in the heart of the city. The concept consists of commissioning luminous artistic works for the rooftops of the buildings bordering the plaza, in the same way, advertisements are installed on the city's glamorous lakefront. The 14 artists invited had to respect the same legal sizes of luminous advertisements in Geneva. The project thus creates a parallax both between locations, and messages, but also by the way one interprets neon signs in the public realm. 

Site-specific performance art, site-specific visual art and interventions are commissioned for the annual Infecting the City Festival in Cape Town, South Africa. The site-specific nature of the work allows artists to interrogate the contemporary and historic reality of the Central Business District and create work that allows the city's users to engage and interact with public spaces in new and memorable ways.

Gallery

See also

Aerial dance
Digital art
Ecological art
Environmental art
Environmental sculpture
Greenmuseum.org (online museum of environmental art)
Independent public art
Karriere Bar
Land art
Land Arts of the American West
Lock On art
Plop art
Rock balancing
Street Installations
Public art
Yarn bombing

References

External links

Visual arts genres
Artistic techniques
Site-specific
Contemporary art
Sculpture
Site-specific
Landscape design history
Landscape architecture
Art

la:Ars situs propria